Christine Deakes (born 10 October 1953) is an Australian former swimmer. She competed in two events at the 1968 Summer Olympics.

References

External links
 

1953 births
Living people
Australian female freestyle swimmers
Olympic swimmers of Australia
Swimmers at the 1968 Summer Olympics
Swimmers from Sydney
20th-century Australian women